A Town Like Alice is a 1956 British drama film produced by Joseph Janni and starring Virginia McKenna and Peter Finch that is based on the 1950 novel of the same name by Nevil Shute. The film does not follow the whole novel, concluding at the end of part two and truncating or omitting much detail. It was partially filmed in Malaya and Australia.

Plot
In post-Second World War London, a young woman, Jean Paget, is informed by solicitor Noel Strachan that she has a large inheritance. Jean uses part of it to build a well in a small village in Malaya. The village women will no longer have to walk so far each day to collect water. She lived and worked there for three years during the war.

The film then goes in flashback to 1942. Jean is working in an office in Kuala Lumpur in Malaya when the Japanese invade. When she stays to help the wife of her employer, Mr. Holland, with her three children, she is taken prisoner, along with other white men, women and children. The men are taken away to prison. The women and children, however, are made to walk from place to place, looking for a ship to transport them to Singapore, but at each place, there is no ship available, and the Japanese authorities have no wish to take responsibility for them.

On their trek, the group meet a young Australian soldier, Sergeant Joe Harman, also a prisoner, who drives a truck for the Japanese. He steals petrol and barters it for medicines for them. He and Jean strike up a friendship in the little time they have together, and he tells her about Alice Springs, the town where he grew up. Jean does not correct his impression that she is married (she is carrying the youngest of Mrs. Holland's children, the mother having succumbed to the endless walking).

One day, the eldest Holland child, a young boy, wanders off into the jungle and is fatally bitten by a snake. At one stop, a Japanese officer  likes Jean's looks and offers to let her and the baby remain, while the rest travel another 200 miles to Kuantan on the east coast. Jean turns away, but another young woman is not so choosy after four months of walking and the deaths of four women and the boy, and gets into the officer's car. More die, including four-year-old Jane Holland.

They run into Joe twice more. The second time, he secretly drops them a package of food as he drives by in a truck. They stop at the same place that night, and Joe and Jean talk some more. She reveals she is not married. Joe steals chickens for them from the harsh Captain Sugaya. However, Sugaya has no trouble identifying the thief: the chickens are nowhere about, and Joe was the only one who left the depot. When the women are found eating chicken, Jean claims they bought the birds, but that is a transparent lie. When Joe sees Jean being relentlessly questioned, he confesses and attacks the interrogator. As punishment, Sugaya has him crucified, nailed to a large tree. The prisoners, both men and women, are forced to watch all day and night.

Sugaya orders the women to continue marching; he leaves them only one guard, the kindly sergeant, so that the sergeant can bear his disgrace alone. When he dies of exhaustion, Jean asks the elders of a Malayan village if they may stay and work in the paddy fields, asking only for food and a place to sleep, telling them that over half of the marchers have died. The elders agree, and they stay there until the war ends. Afterward, Jean gives Mr. Holland back his only surviving child.

The film returns to the present, and Jean is stunned to learn that Joe survived his ordeal. She travels to Alice Springs, then to the (fictional) town of Willstown in the Queensland outback, where Joe has resumed his job as manager of a cattle station. Joe, however, has gone to London to find her. Finally re-united at Alice Springs Airport, they embrace.

Cast

 Virginia McKenna as Jean Paget
 Peter Finch as Joe Harman
 Kenji Takaki as Japanese Sergeant
 Tran Van Khe as Captain Sugaya
 Jean Anderson as Miss Horsefall
 Marie Lohr as Mrs. Dudley Frost
 Maureen Swanson as Ellen
 Renée Houston as Ebbey
 Nora Nicholson as Mrs. Frith
 Eileen Moore as Mrs. Holland
 John Fabian as Mr. Holland
 Vincent Ball as Ben
 Tim Turner as British Sergeant
 Vu Ngoc Tuan as Captain Yanata
 Yamada as Captain Takata
 Nakanishi as Captain Nishi
 Ikeda as Kempetei Sergeant
 Geoffrey Keen as Solicitor
 June Shaw as Mrs. Graham
 Armine Sandford as Mrs. Carstairs
 Mary Allen as Mrs. Anderson
 Virginia Clay as Mrs. Knowles
 Bay White as Mrs. Davies
 Philippa Morgan as Mrs. Lindsay
 Dorothy Moss as Mrs. O'Brien
 Gwenda Ewen as Mrs. Rhodes
 Josephine Miller as Daphne Adams
 Edwina Carroll as Fatima
 Sanny Bin Hussan as Mat Amin
 Charles Marshall as Well Digger
 Jane White as Brenda
 Cameron Moore as Freddie
 Margaret Eaden as Jane
 Domenic Lieven as Michael Rhodes
 Peter John as Timothy
 Meg Buckenham as Mary Graham
 Geoffrey Hawkins as Robin

Production
Leslie Norman expressed interest in making a film of the novel in 1952. At one stage it was announced that Olivia de Havilland would play the lead. Anna Kashfi screen tested for a small role and was given it, but had to turn it down to do another film. Jack Lee had worked with Peter Finch on The Wooden Horse, and cast him as the male lead. "I don't think we ever considered anyone else for the part."

The script was written by W. P. Lipscomb, who concentrated on the first half of the novel (the second half being set in Australia). Producer Joe Janni sent a copy of the script to director Jack Lee, who later recalled, "The script made me cry, and I knew it would make audiences cry too". Janni and Lee took the script to Rank, who agreed to finance. Lee did further work on the script with Lipscombe and then with Richard Mason.

Lee flew to Singapore and Malaya, and "soon realised that if we cast the film in the UK, decided on their exact clothing, and filmed their characteristic way of walking, we could find a second cast in Malaya, and, if we were careful, we could work very close to them on location". Lee shot some footage in Malaya then went back to Britain, where the majority of the film was shot at Pinewood Studios in London.

Release
The film was withdrawn from the 1956 Cannes Film Festival because of fears it would offend the Japanese. "The festivals are just a joke – a film-selling 'racket' which offers the chance for vulgar display and reckless extravagance", said Peter Finch. "They serve no cultural purpose, and the awards don't mean a thing."

The film's Australian premiere was held at Alice Springs.

It was the third most popular film at the British box office in 1956. The film's success saw Rank put Jack Lee and Joe Janni under contract for two years as a team. They went on to make Robbery Under Arms with Finch. The film was released in Los Angeles and Hartford, Connecticut but was not successful and was pulled from release in other parts of the US.

See also
A Town Like Alice (miniseries) – 1981 Australian television adaptation
Tenko (TV series) – 1981–84 BBC and ABC TV series based on the female prisoners of war in Singapore during World War II
Paradise Road (1997 film) – film based on the female prisoners of war in Sumatra in World War II

References

External links 
 
A Town Like Alice at Oz Movies

1956 films
1956 drama films
British drama films
Pacific War films
Films shot at Pinewood Studios
Films set in the Northern Territory
Films set in Malaysia
Films set in London
Films directed by Jack Lee
Films based on Australian novels
1950s English-language films
1950s British films
British black-and-white films